is a Japanese football player. He plays for Olympic FC in National Premier Leagues Queensland.

Career
Takeru Okada joined J1 League club Cerezo Osaka in 2013. In May, he moved to Japan Football League club AC Nagano Parceiro on loan. In 2016, he moved to Regional Leagues club FC Tiamo Hirakata. In September, he moved to Polish II liga club GKS Bełchatów. In March 2017, he returned to FC Tiamo Hirakata.

References

External links

1994 births
Living people
Association football people from Ehime Prefecture
Japanese footballers
J1 League players
J2 League players
Japan Football League players
Cerezo Osaka players
AC Nagano Parceiro players
GKS Bełchatów players
II liga players
Association football midfielders
National Premier Leagues players
Expatriate footballers in Poland
Japanese expatriate footballers
Japanese expatriate sportspeople in Poland